The Lone Star Card is an Electronic Benefit Transfer pin-based card. The card is used for Food Stamp and Temporary Assistance for Needy Families programs for the State of Texas, United States of America.
When the program was implemented in 1995 the system became and still remains the largest EBT system in the United States of America. However this distinction is shared with New York state, alternating the position year to year.

References

External links
 Texas Food Stamp Program

Federal assistance in the United States
1995 introductions
Supplemental Nutrition Assistance Program
1995 establishments in Texas